La Vie is a weekly French Roman Catholic magazine, edited by Malesherbes Publications, a member of the Groupe La Vie-Le Monde.

History
Founded in 1924, by Francisque Gay as La Vie catholique (Catholic Life), the magazine was renamed La vie in 1977.  In 1945, the magazine appeared as La Vie catholique illustrée, as the postwar period placed a great importance on visual magazines (compare Life Magazine in the US).  The magazine was originally targeted at active laity through parish promotions, before eventually being sold on newsstands from 1976.

Its editors in chief were Georges Hourdin, José de Broucker, Jean-Claude Petit, Max Armanet and Jean-Pierre Denis .

Since 1945, the magazine was published by le groupe de presse La Vie catholique, which in 2003 became a part of the larger Groupe La Vie-Le Monde.

In 2001, La Vie created a charitable association which as of 2006 had around three thousand members, based in fifty-odd regional centres across France, called Les Amis de La Vie (Friends of La Vie). This organisation gave deeper meaning to the magazine's tagline, "a paper written with its readers", by organising meetings, debates, and summer programmes.

The publication is independent of the Catholic hierarchy. Because the group to which the paper belongs was bought by Pierre Bergé, an LGBT advocate and media tycoon, the publication expressed support or neutrality over gay marriage in France, amidst pressure from the said owner.

Objectives
The magazine claims three objectives:
 Find deeper meaning in the news of the day, in particular by differentiating the important from the secondary, and the truly newsworthy from the frivolous, but also by paying considerable attention to the changes in the world and society.  The magazine strives to link these changes to the individual lives of its readers, or alternatively to help situate current debates in their historical and cultural context.
 Bring a Christian humanist point of view on the world, putting man at the centre of its values which it enumerates as liberty, solidarity, justice, and tolerance.
 Helping man in day-to-day life, by helping readers to find their personal balance in life with others and interior well-being.

Organisation of the magazine
La Vie is composed of three main components each week:
 An in-depth report, generally on the topic of a current event and composed of investigations, analysis, and different points of view.
 Five main rubrics
 Lifestyle
 The world in movement
 Religion and Spirituality
 Culture
 Television
 A detachable file called "the essentials", which covers a cultural or spiritual topic (not necessarily Christian)

Beyond this, one page is reserved for an interview with a celebrity and the psychoanalyst Gérard Miller.

References

External links
  La Vie online

1924 establishments in France
French-language magazines
News magazines published in France
Weekly magazines published in France
Magazines established in 1924
Catholic magazines
Magazines published in Paris
Catholicism in France